Balaka samoensis is a species of flowering plant in the family Arecaceae. It is endemic to Samoa.

References

samoensis
Endemic flora of Samoa
Least concern plants
Taxa named by Odoardo Beccari
Plants described in 1914